The Casas wrestling family, at times called La Dinastia Casas ("The Casas Dynasty") in Spanish, is a Mexican family of luchadors, or professional wrestlers. The Casas family perform primarily in Mexico but have made appearances in the United States of America, Canada, Europe and Japan over the years.

History
The Casas family started in lucha libre in 1964 when José Casas Granados started wrestling under the ring name Pepe Casas. A second-generation of Casas brothers is also active wrestlers starting with Pepe Casas' oldest son José Casas works under the ring name Negro Casas, younger siblings Jorge Luiz works as El Felino and Erick Casas is better known as Heavy Metal. Pepe Casas has at least one other son, a son who is not involved in wrestling at all but whose children are also third-generation Casas wrestlers.  Jorge Luiz' sons are also professional wrestlers, working as masked wrestlers Tiger and Puma, while sons and daughters of another Casas brother (or brothers)  are wrestlers are working under the ring names Canelo Casas, Danny Casas, Destroyer and Nanyzh Rock. A cousin on Pepe Casas has worked under the ring name "Black Star", one of multiple Luchadors to use that name. José Casas is married to Panamanian professional wrestler Dalys la Caribeña, whom he also trained for her in-ring career and he is the brother-in-law of Rafael Ernesto Medina Baeza, better known under the ring name Veneno ("Venum"). Jorge Luiz Casas is married to Blanca Rodriguez, who until the summer of 2014 wrestled as Princesa Blanca; Blanca Rodriquez is not the mother of Tiger and Puma. In Lucha Libre it is not uncommon for some wrestlers, especially masked wrestlers, to pay for the rights to use a well-established name and play a character that is supposedly a family member of a well known luchador family. This practice does not appear to apply to the Casas family as far as evidence suggests. but it is possible that the true parents of some of the third-generation wrestlers is not entirely accurate, for years Tiger and Puma claimed to be the nephews of Jorge Luiz (El Felino), but later revealed that they were indeed his sons but wanted to make a name for themselves instead of being "Felino Jr." or "El Hijo del Felino" ("The Son of Felino").

Members

First generation
José Casas Granados (May 14, 1943) – Retired wrestler, current referee, works under the ring name "Pepe Casas".

Second generation
José Casas Ruiz (January 1, 1960) – Professional wrestler, works under the ring name Negro Casas.
Jorge Luis Casas Ruiz (March 22, 1964) – Professional wrestler, works under the ring name El Felino.
Erick Francisco Casas Ruiz (October 4, 1970) – Professional wrestler, works under the ring name Heavy Metal.
Black Star - Real name not confirmed.

Third generation
Felino Jr. (February 12, 1987) – Professional wrestler, real name not revealed.
Puma King (July 6, 1990) – Professional wrestler, real name not revealed.
Canelo Casas (1982) – Professional wrestler, real name not confirmed.
Danny Casas (July 13, 1986) – Professional wrestler, birth name not confirmed.
Destroyer  – Professional wrestler, birth name not revealed.
Nanyzh Rock  – Professional wrestler, birth name not revealed.

Related through marriage
Blanca Rodriguez (August 26, 1974) – Retired professional wrestler, married to Jorge Luis Casas;worked under the ring name Princesa Blanca. Not the mother of Tiger and Puma.
Dalys la Caribeña (February 20, 1975) – Professional wrestler, married to José Casas Ruiz; Last name Medina Baeza, first name not revealed.
Rafael Ernesto Medina Baeza (December 7, 1970) – Professional wrestler, brother-in-law of José Casas Granados; works under the ring name Veneno.

Unconfirmed family relationship
Carlos Rodriguez Casas - Professional wrestler; exact relationship to the rest of the Casas family is unclear. Works under the ring name Rush, not to be mistaken for the more well known Rush from CMLL.

Family tree

See also
 List of family relations in professional wrestling

References

Further reading
 Rey Mysterio: Behind the Mask

Mexican professional wrestlers
Professional wrestling families